Brent D. Glass is a public historian who pioneered influential oral history and material culture studies and was Elizabeth MacMillan Director of the Smithsonian's National Museum of American History from 2002-2011. He is an author and international speaker on cultural diplomacy and museum management. He writes on topics ranging from state-of-the-museum blogs to public memory, historic literacy, historic preservation, and industrial history.

Early life
A graduate of Harvard University's Kennedy School of Government nonprofit executive leadership program, Glass earned his doctorate in history from the University of North Carolina-Chapel Hill (1980), master's degree in American Studies from New York University (1971), and bachelor's degree from Lafayette College (1969) where he was a member of the Pi Lambda Phi fraternity. He writes on public history, public memory, historic literacy, historic preservation,  industrial history and the history of Pennsylvania and North Carolina.

Career
Glass was executive director of the North Carolina Humanities Council from 1983 to 1987. From 1987-2002, Glass served as executive director of the Pennsylvania Historical and Museum Commission, managing the largest and most comprehensive state history program in the country, with 25 historical sites and museums, including the State Archives and State Museum; the State Historic Preservation Office, public history programs, and historical publications. Beginning 2002, he was named the director of the National Museum of American History.

In 2008, Glass led a two-year, $85 million renovation of the National Museum of American History, revitalizing public spaces and creating a new public square on the National Mall for citizenship naturalization ceremonies and other public events. Since 2002, he has overseen conservation of the Star-Spangled Banner, creation of major new exhibitions on transportation, maritime history, military history and first ladies' gowns, installation of nearly 50 other exhibitions and hundreds of online and public programs, and the Museum has raised more than $75 million from individuals, foundations and corporations. 
Under Glass’ leadership, the National Museum of American History opened the popular permanent exhibitions, “America on the Move” in November 2003 and “The Price of Freedom: Americans at War” in November 2004, as well as a temporary display, “Treasures of American History,” while the museum was closed for renovations.

Glass is an active member of and consultant to the diplomatic, cultural, and academic communities. He founded Brent D. Glass LLC in 2011 as a museum and history consulting business. The firm specializes in governance, executive recruitment, fundraising, and strategic and master planning. Glass has served as a consultant to more than fifty cultural and historic organizations, including the Sing Sing Prison Museum, the Berkshire Museum, the National Railroad Hall of Fame, the National Museum of Industrial History, the Presidio, and the DeVos Institute of Arts Management.

Glass also has served on several boards and commissions including the Flight 93 Memorial Advisory Commission and the State Department's US-Russian Commission Working Group on Education, Culture, Sports and Media. He has served on the U.S. State Department Diplomatic Center Advisory Committee, the San Francisco Presidio Heritage Advisory Board, and as a trustee of Lafayette College in Easton, Pennsylvania. He has served as a Federal Commissioner of the National Historical Publications and Records Commission and on the National Council of the American Association for State and Local History. A frequent speaker and participant in public diplomacy and cultural diplomacy programs, he has made presentations about museum management, public memory and American history in France, Germany, Italy, China, Russia, Egypt, Mexico, Portugal, Lithuania, Serbia, Slovenia, Croatia, and the Czech Republic.

Works
"50 Great American Places: Essential Historic Sites Across the U.S.", Author Brent D. Glass, Foreword by David McCullough, Simon & Schuster Paperbacks, 2016, 
"Gold Mining in North Carolina: A Bicentennial History", Authors Richard F. Knapp and Brent D. Glass, North Carolina Office of Archives and History, 1999 
"Foreword", African Americans in Pennsylvania: shifting historical perspectives, Authors Joe William Trotter, Eric Ledell Smith, Penn State Press, 1997, 
"A New South Pioneer", Discovering North Carolina: A Tar Heel Reader, Author Jack Claiborne, Editors William Price, UNC Press, 1993, 
"The Textile Industry in North Carolina: A History", Author Brent D. Glass, North Carolina Office of Archives and History, 1992, 
Badin, a town at the Narrows: an historical and architectural survey, Authors Brent D. Glass, Pat Dickinson, Stanly County Historic Properties Commission, 1982
"North Carolina, An Inventory of Historic Engineering and Industrial Sites" Editor Brent Glass, National Park Service, 1975

References

External links
"Brent Glass: Leadership the answer to presidential museum’s problems", The State Journal-Register, May 28, 2015
"It's time for Richmond to tap into history", Times Dispatch, March 22, 2014
Smithsonian National Museum of American History
American Dreamer; The Smithsonian History Museum's New Director Charts Our Brilliant Past (History News Network Article)
"Brent D. Glass Director, National Museum of American History", Smithsonian Institution
"Portrait Accepted - Brent Glass", Colbert Nation, October 16, 2008

C-SPAN Q&A interview with Glass, November 23, 2008

Directors of museums in the United States
New York University alumni
University of North Carolina at Chapel Hill alumni
Smithsonian Institution people
Lafayette College alumni
People from The Five Towns, New York
George W. Hewlett High School alumni
Living people
Harvard Kennedy School alumni
Year of birth missing (living people)